A sojourner is a person who resides temporarily in a place.

Sojourner may also refer to:

Sojourner Truth (1797–1883), abolitionist and women's rights activist
Albert Sojourner (1872–1951), member of the Mississippi House of Representatives
Melanie Sojourner (born 1968) member of the Mississippi State Senate
Mike Sojourner (born 1953), American retired National Basketball League player
Willie Sojourner (1943–2005), basketball player and brother of Mike Sojourner
Sojourner (rover), a robotic rover that was part of the Mars Pathfinder mission
Sojourner (album) a box set by the alternative country band Magnolia Electric Co.
Sojourners, a Christian monthly magazine
Sojourner, a member of the DC Comics superhero team Hellenders
Sojourner (band), a multinational metal band

See also
Sojourner-Douglass College, a private learning institution named after the abolitionist
Sojourner Bolt, the ring name of wrestler Josette Bynum
Sojourn (disambiguation)